The Principality of Ratzeburg was a former state, existing from 1648 to 1918. It belonged to the imperially immediate territory of Duchy of Mecklenburg and was part of the Holy Roman Empire. Mecklenburg was split up in the third partition of Mecklenburg in the 1701 Treaty of Hamburg, which created the semi-ducal states of Mecklenburg-Schwerin and Mecklenburg-Strelitz, with the latter made up of the Principality of Ratzeburg and the Lordship of Stargard. Most of the Principality is now within the state of Mecklenburg-Vorpommern.

History

1648-1806

1815-1918

Later developments

Territories

18th century administrative divisions

Coat of arms

Bibliography
Gottlieb Matthias Carl Masch: Geschichte des Bisthums Ratzeburg. F. Aschenfeldt, Lübeck 1835 (Volltext).
Gottlieb Matthias Carl Masch: Das Ratzeburgische Wappen. In: Jahrbücher des Vereins für Mecklenburgische Geschichte und Altertumskunde . Band 1, 1836, S. 143–151 
Gottlieb Matthias Carl Masch: Gesetze, Verordnungen und Verfügungen, welche für das Fürstenthum Ratzeburg erlassen sind. L. Bicker, Schönberg 1851
Theodor Scharenberg: Gesetze, Verordnungen und Verfügungen, welche in Kirchen- und Schulsachen für das Fürstentum Ratzeburg erlassen sind. Fortsetzung der Gesetzsammlung von Masch, soweit die letztere Kirchen- und Schulsachen betrifft. Spalding, Neustrelitz 1893
Reno Stutz: Ratzeburger Land. Mecklenburgs ungewöhnlicher Landesteil zwischen Wismar und Lübeck. 2. Auflage. Neuer Hochschulschriften Verlag, Rostock 1997, .

External links
http://www.landesbibliographie-mv.de/REL?PPN=247654159
http://www.pfhl.de/fuerstentum/index.html

Principalities of the Holy Roman Empire
History of Mecklenburg
Nordwestmecklenburg
Former states and territories of Mecklenburg-Western Pomerania
1701 establishments in the Holy Roman Empire